The 2021–22 Championnat National 3 was the fifth season of the fifth tier in the French football league system in its current format. The competition is normally contested by 168 clubs split geographically across 12 groups of 14 teams, but this season had 169 clubs due to the administrative relegation of Gazélec Ajaccio. The teams included amateur clubs (although a few were semi-professional) and the reserve teams of professional clubs.

Teams
On 15 July 2021, the FFF ratified the constitution of the competition, and published the groups.

Due to the non-completion of the 2020–21 season, the FFF declared that there would be no regular promotion or relegation from the division, and that any vacancies to be filled would be done on the basis of finishing positions in the 2019–20 season.

Changes from 2020–21 season were as follows, affecting groups C, D, H and K:

 The reserve team of the newly formed Bourges Foot 18 were placed in Group C.
 Tours were administratively relegated from Group C for financial reasons, which was confirmed on appeal.
 Gazélec Ajaccio were administratively relegated from Championnat National 2 for financial reasons, a decision which was confirmed on appeal, and were placed in Group D. The group will have 15 teams this season.
 Vitré and Montpellier (res) were promoted to fill vacancies in Championnat National 2 as best 14th placed teams in the 2019–20 season. They were replaced by Trégunc and Aigues-Mortes

Promotion and relegation
If eligible, the top team in each group is promoted to Championnat National 2. If a team finishing top of the group is ineligible, or declines promotion, the next eligible team in that group is promoted.

Generally, three teams are relegated from each group to their respective top regional league, subject to reprieves. Extra teams are relegated from a group if more than one team is relegated to that group from Championnat National 2. In the case that no teams are relegated to a group from Championnat National 2, one less team is relegated from that group to the regional league.

Reserve teams whose training centres are categorised as category 2B or lower cannot be promoted to Championnat National 2 by the rules of the competition.

League tables

Group A: Nouvelle-Aquitaine

Group B: Pays de la Loire

Group C:  Centre-Val de Loire

Group D: Provence-Alpes-Côte d'Azur-Corsica

Group E: Bourgogne-Franche-Comté

Group F: Grand Est

Group H: Occitanie

Group I: Hauts-de-France

Group J: Normandy

Group K: Brittany

Group L: Île-de-France

Group M: Auvergne-Rhône-Alpes

Top scorers

Season outcomes

Promotion
Stade Bordelais, Saumur, Vierzon, Furiani-Agliani, Racing Besançon, Colmar, Alès, Wasquehal, Évreux, Rennes (res), Racing Club and Thonon Évian finished in the promotion places, and were promoted to 2022–23 Championnat National 2, subject to ratification by the FFF and DNCG.

Relegation
Bressuire, Cognac, Tartas, La Châtaigneraie, Sautron, Saint-Jean-le-Blanc, Déols, Amilly, Istres, Athlético Marseille, Marseille Endoume, Saint-Jean Beaulieu, Mandelieu, Paron, Valdahon-Vercel, Illkirch-Graffenstaden, Saint-Louis Neuweg, Amnéville, Blagnac, Nîmes (res), Muret, Fabrègues, Saint-Omer, Boulogne (res), Le Touquet, Romilly, Bayeux, Stade Pontivyen, Plouzané, Guipry Messac, Trégunc, Créteil (res), Mantes, Meaux Academy, Velay, Aurillac and Moulins finished in the relegation zones and were relegated to Régional 1 for the 2022–23 season, subject to any reprieves confirmed in the next section.

Reprieves
On 14 June 2022, the Occitanie league announced that Narbonne were to be deducted 3 points for not entering a team in the Coupe Gambardella, which is a mandatory rule for competing in National 3. Narbonne appealed, claiming they did enter a team, received a bye in the first round, and forfeited the second round. The decision was upheld on appeal on 21 July 2022. As a result Rodez (res) are reprieved from relegation in Group H.

On 20 June 2022, the DNCG announced that Stade Plabennécois, relegated from 2021–22 Championnat National 2, would be further relegated to Régional 1 level, due to financial issues. The decision is subject to appeal. If the decision is upheld, a reprieve would be required in Group K: Brittany. This would see Stade Pontivyen reprieved.

On 28 June 2022, the Centre-Val de Loire league announced that Tours FC were to be denied promotion from Régional 1 for financial reasons. The decision was overturned on appeal.

On 1 July 2022, the DNCG upheld its previous decision to relegate Béziers from 2021–22 Championnat National 2, reprieving Romorantin. As a result, an extra club would be relegated from Group H: Occitanie, namely Rodez (res), and a club would be reprieved from Group C: Centre-Val de Loire, namely Saint-Jean-le-Blanc

Also on 1 July 2022, the FFF confirmed that Monaco (res), already relegated from 2021–22 Championnat National 2, had declined to participate in Championnat National 3. Therefore, Istres were reprieved from relegation in Group D.

On 12 July 2022, the Grand Est league announced that Mulhouse were to be relegated to Régional 1 for financial reasons. This is subject to appeal. If the decision is upheld, a reprieve would be required in Group E. In all likelihood, due to the short amount of time until the groups for 2022–23 are published, Illkirch Graffenstaden will be reprieved and Mulhouse will be added back to the group if the appeal is successful. Relegation was confirmed when the club was placed into receivership on 21 July 2022.

References 

2021
5
Fra